The Trinidad and Tobago women's cricket team is the women's representative cricket team of the country of Trinidad and Tobago. They compete in the Women's Super50 Cup and the Twenty20 Blaze.

In 1973, they competed in the first World Cup, finishing fifth with two victories. Since, the West Indies have competed as a united team, and Trinidad and Tobago have only competed at domestic level.

History
Trinidad and Tobago first played in 1973, in the lead-up to the 1973 World Cup, which they competed in. They finished 5th in the group of 7, with two wins and four losses. Their victories came against Jamaica and Young England.

Trinidad and Tobago went on to compete in the inaugural Federation Championships in 1975–76, the first season of the West Indian women's domestic system. They finished second in the tournament in its second edition, in 1977, and won their first recorded title in 1989, winning the limited overs section of the Federation Championships.

Trinidad and Tobago went on the become the most successful team in the Federation Championships, with 13 recorded titles, and are the only team to have played in every season of the tournament. When the tournament was split into a league stage and knockout stage in the 1990s and 2000s, they have recorded title victories in 1992, 1994, 1996, 2002 and 2004, as well as winning both formats in 2003 and 2005.

Trinidad and Tobago won the Championships again in 2010, topping their group before beating Barbados in the semi-final and Saint Vincent and the Grenadines in the final. They claimed their most recent titles in two successive seasons, 2016 and 2016–17, beating Barbados in the final both times.

Trinidad and Tobago have also competed in the Twenty20 Blaze since its inception in 2012. They won the third edition of the tournament in 2016, topping their group before beating Jamaica in the final. In the most recent season, 2022, the side finished 3rd in the T20 Blaze and reached the semi-finals of the Super50 Cup.

Players

Current squad
Based on squad announced for the 2022 season. Players in bold have international caps.

Notable players
Players who have played for Trinidad and Tobago and played internationally are listed below, in order of first international appearance (given in brackets). Players listed with a Trinidad and Tobago flag appeared for the side at the 1973 World Cup, which carried One Day International status:

  Beverly Browne (1973)
  Louise Browne (1973)
  Joyce Demmin (1973)
  Christine Jacobson (1973)
  Jane Joseph (1973)
  Janice Moses (1973)
  Emelda Noreiga (1973)
  Maureen Phillips (1973)
  Nora St. Rose (1973)
  Jasmine Sammy (1973)
  Menota Tekah (1973)
  Gloria Farrell (1973)
  Florence Douglas (1973)
  Merlyn Edwards (1973)
  Jeanette James (1973)
  Shirley-Ann Bonaparte (1979)
  Ann Browne (1993)
  Eve Caesar (1993)
  Carol-Ann James (1993)
  Desiree Luke (1993)
  Cherry-Ann Singh (1993)
  Stephanie Power (1993)
  Ann McEwen (1997)
  Gwen Smith (1997)
  Brenda Solzano-Rodney (1997)
  Envis Williams (1997)
  Shane de Silva (2003)
  Nadine George (2003)
  Nelly Williams (2003)
  Felicia Cummings (2003)
  Anisa Mohammed (2003)
  Kirbyina Alexander (2005)
  Deandra Dottin (2008)
  Stacy-Ann King (2008)
  Lee-Ann Kirby (2008)
  Merissa Aguilleira (2008)
  Gaitri Seetahal (2008)
  Amanda Samaroo (2009)
  Britney Cooper (2009)
  Felicia Walters (2017)
  Reniece Boyce (2017)
  Karishma Ramharack (2019)
  Caniesha Isaac (2021)
  Djenaba Joseph (2022)

Honours
 Women's Super50 Cup:
 Winners (13): 1989, 1992, 1994, 1996, 2002 (Knockout), 2003 (League), 2003 (Knockout), 2004 (Knockout), 2005 (League), 2005 (Knockout), 2010, 2016, 2016–17
 Twenty20 Blaze:
 Winners (1): 2016

Records

One-Day Internationals
Highest team total: 124 vs Australia, 30 June 1973.
Highest individual score: 50*, Louise Browne vs Jamaica, 4 July 1973.
Best innings bowling: 3/7, Jane Joseph vs Young England, 14 July 1973.

See also
 List of Trinidad and Tobago women ODI cricketers
 Trinidad and Tobago national cricket team
 Trinbago Knight Riders (WCPL)

Notes

References

Women's cricket in Trinidad and Tobago
Women's national cricket teams
Women
Women's cricket teams in the West Indies
1973 Women's Cricket World Cup
1973 establishments in Trinidad and Tobago
C